Marcus Cassianius Latinius Postumus was a Roman commander of Batavian origin, who ruled as emperor of the splinter state of the Roman Empire known to modern historians as the Gallic Empire. The Roman army in Gaul threw off its allegiance to Gallienus around the year 260, and Postumus assumed the title and powers of Emperor in the provinces of Gaul, Germania, Britannia, and Hispania. He ruled for the better part of ten years before he was murdered by his own troops.

Life

Rise to power
Little is known about the early life of Postumus. He has been claimed as being of Batavian origin; certainly his coinage honors deities—Hercules Magusanus and Hercules Deusoniensis—who would have been popular among the Batavians. Hercules Magusanus was probably an interpretatio romana translation of the Germanic deity Þunraz. Deusoniensis may refer to the town of Deuso, located in or near Batavian territory and likely to be identified with modern-day Diessen; it has been hypothesized that Postumus himself was born in Deuso. From these relatively obscure provincial origins, Postumus would have risen through the ranks of the army until he held command of the Roman forces "...among the Celts". What his precise title was is not definitely known, though he may plausibly have been promoted by the emperor Valerian to the position of imperial legate of Germania Inferior. Postumus was evidently in favour at court, and, according to König, was granted an honorary consulship.

By 259, Valerian was campaigning in the east against the Persians, while his son and co-emperor Gallienus was preoccupied with the situation on the Danubian frontier. Consequently, Gallienus left his son, Saloninus, and military commanders, including Postumus, to protect the Rhine. Amid the chaos of an invasion by the Alamanni and Franks, and spurred on by news of the defeat and capture of Valerian, the army in Gaul revolted and proclaimed Postumus emperor.

The trigger was their defeat in 260 of a Juthungian army which was returning from Italy laden with prisoners, even though they had been repulsed by Gallienus at Mediolanum (Milan).  Under the command of Postumus and Marcus Simplicinius Genialis, the Roman army crushed the Juthungi, and Postumus proceeded to distribute the captured spoils to the legions he commanded.  Saloninus, on the advice of his praetorian prefect Silvanus (who had coordinated Roman policy in Gaul alongside Postumus), demanded the transfer of the recovered booty to his residence at Colonia Claudia Ara Agrippinensium (Cologne). Postumus assembled his army and made a show of reluctantly enforcing this command, thus inviting his troops to instead throw off their allegiance to Gallienus. The troops accordingly proclaimed Postumus emperor and besieged Colonia, trapping Saloninus and Silvanus. After breaching the walls of the city, Postumus had Silvanus and Saloninus killed, although his supporters later claimed that it was the native Gauls who were responsible for the murders. Later he erected a triumphal arch to celebrate his victory.

Establishment of a Gallic Empire

Postumus was immediately recognized as emperor in Gaul (except perhaps for the province of Gallia Narbonensis), Germania Superior and Inferior, and Raetia.  By 261, Britannia, Narbonensis and Hispania also acknowledged him as emperor, possibly after an expedition to Britain in the winter of 260–261. He established his capital in northern Gaul, probably at Colonia Claudia Ara Agrippinensium or Augusta Treverorum (Trier), and furnished his government with many of the traditional Roman legislative and executive structures.  Apart from the position of emperor, he immediately assumed the office of consul alongside a colleague, Honoratianus. Like his imperial predecessors, he became the pontifex maximus of the state and assumed tribunician power each year. He is thought to have established a senate, perhaps on the basis of the Council of the Three Gauls or provincial councils, and a Pretorian Guard, one of whose officers was the future Gallic emperor Victorinus. The chief members of Postumus' administration, such as Victorinus and Tetricus, appear to have been drawn from his power base in northern Gaul, and indeed the entire administration rapidly became Gallicized.

Postumus represented himself as the restorer of Gaul (Restitutor Galliarum) and the bringer of security to the provinces (Salus Provinciarum) on some of his coins; prior to 10 December 261, he also took the title of Germanicus maximus, a title he earned after successfully defending Gaul against the Germans. His principal objective in assuming the purple appeared to be the restoration and defence of the Rhine frontier and the surrounding area, a task that he approached with vigour, earning the admiration of the ancient authors, who declared that he restored the security that the provinces had enjoyed in the past. So successful was he in the task of stabilizing his domain that the coins issued by Postumus were of better workmanship and higher precious metal content than coins issued by Gallienus. His control of the Spanish and British mining regions was presumably crucial in this regard, as was his employment of master minters who would have come into Gaul with Gallienus. Postumus fought successful campaigns against the Franks and Alemanni in 262 and 263; following his victory over them in 263, his coin-types celebrated peaceful themes such as Felicitas Augusti for some time. After having spent much of the last four years pushing the Franks out of Gaul, Postumus then recruited Frankish troops to fight against other Franks, probably dispersed within existing Roman army units.

Scholars continue to debate whether Postumus originally intended to dislodge Gallienus from Rome or was content to rule only the western provinces. From the beginning of his usurpation, Postumus had made it clear that his priority was for Gaul, and that he had no immediate intentions to make a bid for Rome. Postumus' power base was Gaul and his main responsibility was the defense of the Rhine provinces. If he marched against Gallienus, then he would be exposing his heartland not only to the Germanic tribes but also potentially to any number of usurpers.  Perhaps he hoped to achieve some official recognition from Gallienus; what is clear, however, is that Postumus was not overtly separatist and did not revive the 1st-century dream of an independent Galliarum imperium. (See Julius Sabinus and revolt of the Batavi.) The forms, titles, and administrative structures of Postumus' principate remained conventionally Roman.

Confrontation with Gallienus
For four years Gallienus was too distracted by Germanic invasions and other usurpers in the east to address the situation to his north and west, but in 265 he launched a campaign to defeat Postumus.  His first attempt failed when Postumus managed to escape from a precarious situation due to the carelessness of Gallienus' cavalry commander Aureolus. Aureolus was punished with demotion, eventually leading him to turn against Gallienus in 267.

A second campaign, led by Gallienus himself, also seemed to have the advantage over Postumus, but while Gallienus was besieging a city in Gaul (perhaps Augusta Treverorum), he was wounded and forced to withdraw. After this, Gallienus was occupied with crises in the rest of his empire and did not confront Postumus again.

Final years

By the end of 265, Postumus' coin issues were triumphantly commemorating the victory over Gallienus, and the festivities celebrating his quinquennalia continued into the following year. Very little troubled the reign of Postumus from 265 to 268; archaeological evidence, such as it is, points to a general return to peace and normalcy. In 266, Postumus became consul for the fourth time, taking as his colleague Marcus Piavonius Victorinus, a Gallic noble who was also a senior military officer; his selection to such a high-profile position may be seen as an attempt to broaden Postumus' base of support. The year 268 saw the issuing of the 'Labours of Hercules' series of gold coins in honour of Postumus' favourite god. A sudden debasement of the coinage later that year shows that Postumus was facing increasing financial difficulties, due perhaps to a disruption of silver production in the Spanish mines or the need to buy off an increasingly discontented army.

Such discontent was probably due to Postumus' failure to take advantage of a golden opportunity to move against Gallienus in 268. Aureolus, the general who was in command of Mediolanum (Milan) in Gallienus' interest, rebelled and ultimately declared for Postumus. The city of Mediolanum and its north Italian and Raetian hinterland would have been critical to Postumus if he planned to march on Rome. For whatever reason, Postumus failed to support Aureolus, who was defeated by Gallienus and besieged inside Mediolanum.  Before the end of summer in 268, Gallienus was assassinated, and his successor, Claudius II, captured and killed Aureolus. At the same time, a sequence of events began which would end Postumus' rule in Gaul.

Fall
Postumus assumed his fifth consulship on 1 January 269, but the army in Germania Superior raised a usurper in early 269. Laelianus, one of Postumus' top military leaders and the governor of Germania Superior, was declared emperor in Mogontiacum (Mainz) by the local garrison and surrounding troops (Legio XXII Primigenia).  Within a few months, Postumus was able to capture Mogontiacum and kill Laelianus. His army wanted to sack the defeated city, and when Postumus tried to restrain them, the soldiers turned on him and killed him.

The mutineers set up Marius, a common soldier, as emperor. Marius held sway for a short while before being overthrown by Victorinus, Postumus' erstwhile colleague in the consulship and tribune of the praetorian guard. In the meantime, the Gallic Empire lost Hispania.

Legacy

Postumus' coinage has been of particular interest to numismatists, in light of the high quality and relative abundance of his coin issues. His ‘Labours of Hercules’ series is particularly renowned, as are several aurei which carry full-face portraits of Postumus instead of the usual profile view.

Historical sources
Most of the ancient literary references to Postumus come from the works thought to be based on the Enmannsche Kaisergeschichte (Aurelius Victor, Epitome de Caesaribus, Eutropius, and the Historia Augusta, in the last of which Postumus is listed among the Thirty Tyrants). He also figures in the works of Zosimus and Zonaras.

Notes

References 

Primary sources
 Aurelius Victor, Liber de Caesaribus
 Epitome de Caesaribus (sometimes attributed to Aurelius Victor)
 Eutropius, Brevarium, Book 9
 Historia Augusta, Tyranni_XXX*.html The Thirty Tyrants
 Joannes Zonaras, Compendium of History extract: Zonaras: Alexander Severus to Diocletian: 222–284
 Zosimus, Historia Nova

Secondary sources
 Bakker, Lothar. (1993), "Raetien unter Postumus. Das Siegesdenkmal einer Juthungenschlacht im Jahre 260 n. Chr. aus Augsburg." Germania 71, pp. 369–386.
 
 
 
  (Archive)

External links 

 Partial coinage listing featuring Postumus

269 deaths
Year of birth unknown
Gallic emperors
Imperial Roman consuls
3rd-century Roman usurpers
3rd-century murdered monarchs
Germanic warriors
Thirty Tyrants (Roman)
3rd-century monarchs in Europe
Batavian people
Germanic rulers
Roman governors of Germania Inferior
Cassianii
Murdered Roman emperors
Gallic consuls